Margaret Helen Bennett (September 17, 1910June 7, 1984) was an American figure skater.  She won the silver medal at the U.S. Figure Skating Championships in 1932 and competed in that year's Winter Olympics.

Bennett was born in Minneapolis, Minnesota and died  in Chester, Connecticut.

Results

References

1910 births
1984 deaths
American female single skaters
Figure skaters at the 1932 Winter Olympics
Olympic figure skaters of the United States
Sportspeople from Minneapolis
People from Chester, Connecticut
20th-century American women